Chukwuemeka Paul "Emeka" Nnamani (born 4 November 2001) is a Danish professional footballer who plays for Danish 1st Division club Nykøbing FC. Born in Denmark, he is of Nigerian descent.

Club career

Nordsjælland
Nnamani was born in Rødovre, and joined the Nordsjælland academy at U11 level. He attended Bagsværd Kostskole og Gymnasium during his time at the academy where he graduated in 2020. He finished as the top goalscorer in the 2019–20 U19 League with 14 goals.

He made his Danish Superliga debut for Nordsjælland on 22 November 2020 in a game against AaB.

Nykøbing
On 1 February 2022, Nnamani joined 1st Division club Nykøbing on loan for the rest of the season. He made his competitive debut for the club on 25 February in a 2–0 loss away against Helsingør. Nnamani scored his first professional goal on 18 March in a 4–1 home loss to AC Horsens after coming on at half-time in a man of the match performance.

On 15 May 2022 Nykøbing confirmed, that Nnamani had signed a permanent deal with the club, until June 2025.

References

External links
 

2001 births
People from Rødovre
Danish people of Nigerian descent
Living people
Danish men's footballers
Denmark youth international footballers
Association football forwards
FC Nordsjælland players
Nykøbing FC players
Danish Superliga players
Danish 1st Division players
Sportspeople from the Capital Region of Denmark